The Minister of Defence of Libya is the politically appointed head of the Libyan ministry of defence and is responsible for the Libyan Armed Forces.

List of ministers

Kingdom of Libya (1951–1969)

Libyan Arab Republic (1969–1977)

Libyan Arab Jamahiriya (1977–2011)

National Transitional Council (2011–2012)

General National Congress (2012–2016)

Government of National Accord (2016–2021)

Government of National Unity (2021–present)

References

Politics of Libya
Political organizations based in Libya
Government of Libya